General Sir John Douglas of Glenfinart  (7 July 1817 – 8 September 1888) was a British Army officer who became Commander-in-Chief, Scotland.

Military career
Born the son of Lieutenant General Sir Neil Douglas, Douglas was commissioned in 1833. He commanded the 79th Regiment of Foot at the Battle of Alma in September 1854, at the Battle of Balaclava in October 1854 and at the Siege of Sebastopol in Winter 1854 during the Crimean War. He also took part in the response to the Indian Mutiny.

He went on to command the troops in the North British District from in 1873 before retiring in 1875. He was given the colonelcy of The Queen's Own Cameron Highlanders from 1879 to 1887 and promoted full general on 30 January 1880.

He married Lady Elizabeth Cathcart, eldest daughter of the 2nd Earl of Cathcart. They had two surviving sons, born 13 years apart: Neil Douglas Cecil Frederick Douglas (born 1844) and Charles John Cathcart Douglas (born 1857).

He died in 1888 and was buried in the graveyard of St Munn's Parish Church, Kilmun. A memorial also exists on the central vault in Dalry Cemetery in west Edinburgh.

References

 

|-

1817 births
1888 deaths
British Army generals
Knights Grand Cross of the Order of the Bath
Burials at Kilmun Parish Church